Halocynthiibacter namhaensis is a Gram-negative, rod-shaped and non-motile bacterium from the genus of Halocynthiibacter which has been isolated from the sea squirt Halocynthia roretzi from the South Sea in Korea.

References 

Rhodobacteraceae
Bacteria described in 2014